Wayne Heseltine is an English former professional footballer who played as a full back.

Career
Heseltine began his career with the youth team of Manchester United, but never made a first-team appearance. He left to join Oldham Athletic in December 1989 for a fee of £40,000, moving onto Bradford City in August 1992 on a free transfer, having made only one appearance in the Football League. Heseltine spent a further two years at Bradford City, making 54 appearances in the League, before playing non-league football with Guiseley.

References

Year of birth missing (living people)
Living people
English footballers
Manchester United F.C. players
Oldham Athletic A.F.C. players
Bradford City A.F.C. players
Guiseley A.F.C. players
English Football League players
Association football fullbacks